Landcorp Farming Limited ("Landcorp") is a state-owned enterprise of the New Zealand government. Its brand name is Pāmu, the Te Reo Māori word 'to farm'. Its core business is pastoral farming including dairy, sheep, beef and deer, as well as a Foods business marketing milk and meat products globally under the Pāmu brand and as a supplier to other food processors. Pāmu manages 117 properties carrying over 1 million stock units on 3366,3426 hectares of property under management.

History

Landcorp was incorporated as a State-owned Enterprise on 1 April 1987 to assume the commercial farming and property activities of the former Department of Lands and Survey. It operates under the State Owned Enterprises Act 1986. Landcorp is New Zealand's largest farmer, with over $1.7 billion in total assets. It farms 117 beef, dairy, deer and sheep farms - 84 are owned directly by the company and the others are farmed on behalf of the Crown or private interests.  It also owns Focus Genetics, an animal genetics company, and has a 50% investment in Spring Sheep Milk; as well as investments in FarmIQ  and Melody Dairies. The company has won a food innovation award for its ground breaking deer milk innovation, and was ranked in the top 10 innovative companies in Australasia in the agriculture category in the 2019 AFR Innovation Awards. Landcorp employees about 700 permanent staff and up to an additional 300 staff during busy periods. It farms about 440000 Sheep, 80000 beef cattle, 74000 dairy cows and 89000 deer. The company has over 9400 hectares in plantation forestry.

Services

Landcorp has three main subsidiary companies:

 Landcorp Pastoral Limited holds the investments in Focus Genetics and Spring Sheep
 Landcorp Estates Limited works with joint venture partners to develop land.
 Landcorp Holdings Limited holds selected properties under an agreement with the Crown, with these properties deemed "sensitive" in relation to public policy issues. The properties cannot be sold by Landcorp and continue to be farmed until required by the Crown, principally for Treaty of Waitangi settlements.

References

Agriculture in New Zealand
Government-owned companies of New Zealand